Somerhill may refer to:
Somerhill House, Tonbridge, United Kingdom
The Schools at Somerhill (located in Somerhill House)
Somerhill Gallery, Durham, North Carolina, an art gallery

See also
Summerhill (disambiguation)